Surazh can mean

 Surazh, Russia, a town in Bryansk Oblast, Russia
 Surazh, Belarus, alternatively spelled Suraž, an urban-type settlement in Vitebsk Oblast, Belarus
 Suraż, a town in Poland